Mercedes-Benz is a German automotive brand owned by Mercedes-Benz Group. It may also refer to:

Songs
 "Mercedes Benz" (song), a 1971 song by Janis Joplin and Bob Neuwirth
 "Mercedes-Benz" (Sway song), a 2009 song by Sway

Stadiums
 Mercedes-Benz Arena (Berlin), Germany
 Mercedes-Benz Arena (Stuttgart), Baden-Württemberg, Germany
 Mercedes-Benz Arena (Shanghai), China
 Mercedes-Benz Stadium, a multi-purpose stadium in Atlanta, Georgia, United States
 Mercedes-Benz Superdome, the former name of Caesars Superdome in New Orleans, Louisiana, United States